Logan County is a county located in the U.S. state of Illinois. According to the 2020 census, it had a population of 27,987. Its county seat is Lincoln.

Logan County comprises the Lincoln, IL Micropolitan Statistical Area, which is included in the Springfield-Jacksonville-Lincoln, IL Combined Statistical Area.

History
Established in 1839, Logan County was named after physician and State Representative John Logan, father of Union General John Alexander Logan.

Geography

Climate and weather

Major highways
  Interstate 55
  Interstate 155
  U.S. Highway 136
  Illinois Route 10
  Illinois Route 54
  Illinois Route 121

Adjacent counties
 Mason County - northwest
 Tazewell County - north
 McLean County - northeast
 De Witt County - east
 Macon County - southeast
 Sangamon County - south
 Menard County - west

Demographics

According to the 2010 United States Census, there were 30,305 people, 11,070 households, and 7,274 families residing in the county. The racial makeup of the county was 89.1% white, 7.5% black or African American, 0.6% Asian, 0.2% American Indian, 1.2% from other races, and 1.3% from two or more races. Those of Hispanic or Latino origin made up 2.9% of the population. In terms of ancestry, 30.9% were German, 17.4% were American, 13.1% were Irish, and 10.8% were English.

Of the 11,070 households, 29.7% had children under the age of 18 living with them, 50.3% were married couples living together, 10.6% had a female householder with no husband present, 34.3% were non-families, and 29.2% of all households were made up of individuals. The average household size was 2.34 and the average family size was 2.85. The median age was 39.4 years.
14.4% of the population were living in group quarters including 11.4% of the population institutionalized.

The median income for a household in the county was $48,999 and the median income for a family was $63,245. Males had a median income of $43,940 versus $31,783 for females. The per capita income for the county was $22,063. About 6.8% of families and 9.8% of the population were below the poverty line, including 15.1% of those under age 18 and 5.2% of those age 65 or over.

Communities

Cities
 Atlanta
 Lincoln (seat)
 Mount Pulaski

Villages

 Broadwell
 Elkhart
 Emden
 Hartsburg
 Latham
 Middletown
 New Holland
 San Jose

Census-designated places
 Beason
 Chestnut
 Cornland

Unincorporated communities

 Bakerville
 Bell
 Burtonview
 Chestervale
 Croft
 Evans
 Fogarty
 Harness
 Lake Fork
 Lawndale
 Lucas
 Mount Fulcher
 Mountjoy
 Narita
 Skelton
 Union

Townships

 Aetna
 Atlanta
 Broadwell
 Chester
 Corwin
 East Lincoln
 Elkhart
 Eminence
 Hurlbut
 Laenna
 Lake Fork
 Mt. Pulaski
 Oran
 Orvil
 Prairie Creek
 Sheridan
 West Lincoln

Government and infrastructure

The Illinois Department of Corrections Logan Correctional Center is located in unincorporated Logan County, near Lincoln.

Politics
In the period following the Civil, War Logan was a swing county, following the popular vote winner in every election up to 1936 except those of 1900 and 1916. Since 1940, when its isolationist sentiment drove voters to Wendell Willkie, Logan has become a strongly Republican county. No Democratic presidential candidate has won Logan County since Lyndon Johnson’s 1964 landslide over Barry Goldwater. In fact, apart from Johnson, Barack Obama in 2008 is the solitary Democrat to reach forty percent in the past nineteen elections.

Notable people
 Brian Cook, NBA player
 Norm Cook, NBA player
 Robert A. Emmitt, Oregon armer and legislator
 Terry Kinney, actor
 Edward Madigan, Former United States Secretary of Agriculture
 William Keepers Maxwell Jr., editor, novelist, short story writeril

See also

 National Register of Historic Places listings in Logan County, Illinois

References

External links
 Official website

 
Illinois counties
1839 establishments in Illinois
Populated places established in 1839